Pseudalelimma is a monotypic moth genus of the family Erebidae. Its only species, Pseudalelimma miwai, is known from Japan. Both the genus and the species were first described by Hiroshi Inoue in 1965.

References

Herminiinae
Monotypic moth genera